Placynthiopsis is a genus of lichenized fungi within the Placynthiaceae family. It is monotypic, containing only the species Placynthiopsis africana.

References

Peltigerales
Lichen genera
Peltigerales genera